St Agatha's is a  Roman Catholic church on Wyndham Road in Kingston upon Thames, London. It is dedicated to Saint Agatha of Sicily.

The Italianate church building, which is Grade II listed by Historic England, was erected in 1899. It was designed by the Leeds-based architect John Kelly  and its construction was funded by a local benefactor, Louisa Curry.

References

External links
Official website

1899 establishments in England
19th-century Roman Catholic church buildings in the United Kingdom
Grade II listed buildings in the Royal Borough of Kingston upon Thames
Grade II listed Roman Catholic churches in England
Italianate architecture in England
Roman Catholic churches completed in 1899
Saint Agatha
Churches in the Diocese of Southwark
Italianate church buildings in the United Kingdom